The Belgian born Émile Fernand-Dubois (1869–1952) was a sculptor and medallist.

Dubois exhibited on a regular basis especially at the Salon de la Société des Artistes Français. It seems that Dubois became an honorary curator of the Museum of Cosne-sur–Loire later in life and died at Villejuif in 1952, poor and forgotten

Marianne, bust
He was well known for his bust of Marianne, the original of which can be found in the museum at Cosne-sur-Loire in the Nièvre region which also holds many casts of his works. The Marianne bust was replicated many times and examples can be seen throughout France, normally in pride of place in the "mairie".

Monument aux morts
Dubois worked on many monument aux morts (war memorials), such as those at Avion, Saint-Amand-en-Puisaye and Cosne-sur-Loire.

Other monuments aux morts

Fernand-Dubois completed the Nièvre monument aux morts and those at Ciez, Perroy and Saint-Vérain.

Other works

See also 
 Émile Fernand-Dubois (French)

References

External links 
 Includes photograph of Fernand-Dubois's relief
 Article with photograph

1869 births
1952 deaths
20th-century French sculptors
19th-century French sculptors
French male sculptors
19th-century French male artists